The Matsushiro earthquake swarm was an earthquake swarm that occurred near Matsushiro, a suburb of Nagano, to the northwest of Tokyo in 1965. The event is one of the best ever documented earthquake swarms.

Overview 
The Matsushiro swarm lasted from 1965 to 1967 and generated about 1 million earthquakes. The total sum of energy from all the tremors was approximately equivalent to an M6.4 earthquake. This swarm had the peculiarity to be sited just under a seismological observatory installed in 1947 in a decommissioned military tunnel. It began in August 1965 with three earthquakes too weak to be felt, but three months later, a hundred earthquakes could be felt daily. On 17 April 1966, the observatory recorded 6,780 earthquakes, with 585 of them having a magnitude large enough to be felt, which meant that one earthquake could be felt every 2 minutes 30 seconds the average. The phenomenon was clearly identified as linked to a magma uplift, perhaps initiated by the 1964 Niigata earthquake which happened one year before.

References 

1965 earthquakes
1966 earthquakes
1967 earthquakes
1965 in Japan
1966 in Japan
1967 in Japan
Earthquakes of the Showa period
Earthquake swarms
Earthquake clusters, swarms, and sequences